was a Japanese artist who worked in a variety of media, including photography and engraving.

Life and career
Ei-Q, whose early work was done under his real name of Hideo Sugita (Sugita Hideo), was born in Miyazaki-machi (now Miyazaki City), Miyazaki Prefecture on April 28, 1911. In 1925 Sugita entered an art school in Tokyo to study western-style painting, and his criticism of western art started appearing in the art magazines Atelier and Mizue in 1927, in which year he also left the school. In 1930 he entered a photography school and from then on pursued both painting and photography and more particularly photograms, first experimenting briefly with these in 1930, then dropping them in pursuit of painting, and then returning to them in 1936. 

Ei-Q was influenced by the Surrealist aesthetic and also published essays promoting photography as an art form independent of painting. This did not imply a rejection of painting, and he worked toward what in 1935 he termed photo-dessins, a fusion of photograms and paintings. A first collection of these, published in an edition of 40 in 1936 as Nemuri no riyū ("the reason for sleep"), took him to the forefront of the Japanese avant garde. Akiko Okatsuka rates Ei-Q (as he had named himself in 1935), together with Sutezō Otono, as standing out among the many Japanese exponents of photograms, unlike the majority in their ability to use them for expressive rather than merely playful ends. Ei-Q also contributed photograms and photography criticism to Photo Times. (He also became an enthusiastic proponent of Esperanto at about the same time.)

Ei-Q set up the art organization Jiyū Bijutsu Kyōkai in 1937; this lasted until 1951.

Ei-Q was able to resume his work after the war and in 1951 set up the group Democratic Artists Association (Demokurāto Bijutsuka Kyōkai) in Osaka. Membership was by invitation only, but the idea was to promote the free expression of members, who included woodblock artists, designers, photographers and others. On Ei-Q's move from Osaka to Urawa later in the same year, the group set up a branch in nearby Tokyo as well; Eikoh Hosoe and Takeji Iwamiya then joined. The Association lasted until 1957, holding exhibitions of its works.

Also in 1951 Ei-Q started etching and lithography; he would continue exploring new art media until his death. He was also active in art education, in 1952 setting up Sōzō Biiku Kyōkai.

Ei-Q died on March 10, 1960.

Exhibitions
"Ei-Q photo-dessins". 1936.
"Ei-Q photo-dessins". 1951.
"Dai ikkai Tōkyō kokusai hanga biennāre-ten" (i.e. the first Tokyo international biennale of wood engravings). 1957.
"Ei-Q kaiko-ten". 1970.
"Modanizumu no kōseki: Onchi Kōshirō, Ei-Q" / "Traces of Light in Modernism: Koshiro Onchi, Osamu Shiihara and Ei-Kyu". National Museum of Modern Art, Tokyo, February–March 1997. The work of Kōshirō Onchi, Osamu Shiihara, and Ei-Q.
"Demokurāto 1951–1957: Kaihō sareta sengo bijutsu". Museum of Modern Art, Saitama, August–October 1999.
"Ei-Q no himitsu-ten: Āto ni deau natsu" vol. 2. Fukuoka Art Museum (Fukuoka), July–August 2000.
"Ei-Q, Ay-O, Ikeda Masuo" Sayama Shiritsu Hakubutsukan (Sayama), October–December 2000. An exhibition of Ei-Q, Ay-O and Masuo Ikeda.
"Urawa gaka to sono jidai: Terauchi Manjirō, Ei-Q, Takada Makoto o chūshin ni". Urawa Art Museum (Urawa), 2000. 　Catalogue of the opening exhibition of the museum, on the painters of Urawa, and particularly Manjirō Terauchi, Ei-Q, and Makoto Takada.
"Ei-Q foto-dessan-ten" / "Ei-Q Photo Dessin". National Museum of Art, Osaka (Suita), October–December 2005.
"Ei-Q-ten". Kawagoe Gallery, February 2006.
"Ei-Q to sono shūhen". Machida City Museum of Graphic Arts (Machida), June–September 2008.
"Ei-Q-ten". Kawagoe Gallery, September 2008.

Works in permanent collections
Works by Ei-Q are in the permanent collections of the following institutions:
Ashiya City Museum of Art and History (Ashiya)
Fukuoka Art Museum (Fukuoka City); 45 photo-dessins.
Homma Museum of Art (Sakata).
Mie Prefectural Art Museum (Tsu).
Miyagi Museum of Art (Sendai)
Miyakonojo City Museum of Art (Miyakonojo).
Miyazaki Prefectural Art Museum (Miyazaki City)
Nagashima Museum (Kagoshima City).
Niigata City Art Museum (Niigata City).
Okawa Museum of Art (Kiryū).
Museum of Modern Art, Saitama (Saitama City); 98 photo-dessins and five photo collages.
Takamatsu City Museum of Art (Takamatsu).
Tokushima Modern Art Museum (Tokushima City)
Tokyo Metropolitan Museum of Photography
Museum of Contemporary Art, Tokyo.
Toneyama Kōjin Kinen Bijutsukan (Kitakami).
Urawa Art Museum (Urawa)
Museum of Modern Art, Wakayama (Wakayama City)
Yokohama Museum of Art (Yokohama).
Yokosuka Museum of Art (Yokosuka).

Books by and of Ei-Q 
Ei-Q. Nemuri no riyū: Ei-Q-shi fotodessan sakuhinshū (. Geijutsugaku Kenkyūkai, 1936.
Ei-Q and Kiyomi Shimazaki. Dōbanga no tsukurikata (. Tokyo: Mon Shoten, 1956.  An introductory practical book about etching.
Mitsuharu Yamada. Ei-Q: Hyōden to sakuhin. Tokyo: Seiryūdō, 1976. 
Ei-Q-shi fotodessan-ten (. Fukuoka: Fukuoka Art Museum, 1978.
Ei-Q-ten: Gendai bijutsu no chichi. N.p.: Ei-Q-ten Kaisai Iinkai, 1979. 
Sadajirō Kubo. Ei-Q to nakama-tachi. Kubo Sadajirō Bijutsu no Sekai 2. Tokyo: Sōbunsha, 1985. .
Ei-Q to sono shūhen. Tokyo: Yomiuri Shinbunsha, 1986.  Catalogue of an exhibition, held at the Museum of Modern Art, Saitama and elsewhere, of the work of Ei-Q and his circle.
Ei-Q foto-dessan-ten. Tokyo: Asahi Shinbunsha, 1987.  Catalogue of an exhibition of Ei-Q's photo-dessins.
Ei-Q to sono nakama-tachi-ten. Machida, Tokyo: Machida City Museum of Graphic Art, 1988.  Catalogue of an exhibition held at Machida City Museum of Graphic Art in 1988.
Ei-Q-ten: Yusai, foto-dessan, hanga. Itami: Itami City Museum of Art, 1990.  Catalogue of an exhibition of Ei-Q's oil paintings, photo-dessins and wood block prints held at the Itami City Museum of Art.
Ei-Q sakuhinshū. Tokyo: Nihon Keizai Shinbun-sha, 1997. .  A collection of the work of Ei-Q.
Hikari no kaseki: Ei-Q to fotoguramu no sekai. Urawa: Museum of Modern Art, Saitama, 1997.  Catalogue of an exhibition of Ei-Q's photograms.
Modanizumu no kōseki: Onchi Kōshirō, Ei-Q ) / Traces of Light in Modernism: Koshiro Onchi, Osamu Shiihara and Ei-Kyu. Tokyo: National Museum of Modern Art, Tokyo, 1997.    Catalogue of an exhibition at the National Museum of Modern Art, Tokyo of the work of Kōshirō Onchi, Osamu Shiihara, and Ei-Q.
Ei-Q no himitsu-ten: Āto ni deau natsu vol. 2. Fukuoka: Fukuoka Art Museum, 2000.
Urawa gaka to sono jidai: Terauchi Manjirō, Ei-Q, Takada Makoto o chūshin ni. Urawa, Saitama: Urawa Art Museum, 2000. 　Catalogue of the opening exhibition of Urawa Art Museum, on the painters of Urawa, and particularly Manjirō Terauchi, Ei-Q, and Makoto Takada.
Ei-Q kara no tegami. Ei-Q Bijutsukan, 2000. 
Masaomi Sugita. Chichi. Miyazaki 21-seki Bunko 27. Miyazaki: Kōmyakusha, 2000. .  A book about Ei-Q by his son.
Hirofumi Wada. Ei-Q, Shimozato Yoshio: renzu no avangyarudo. Vol. 14 of Korekushon Nihon shūrurearisumu. Tokyo: Hon no Tomo-sha, 2001. .  On Ei-Q, Yoshio Shimozato, and surrealism in Japanese photography.
Ei-Q foto-dessan-ten. Suita, Osaka: National Museum of Art, Osaka, 2005.  Catalogue of an exhibition held at the National Museum of Art, Osaka of Ei-Q's photo-dessins.

Notes

External links
Chronology, Okawa Museum of Art. 

Japanese etchers
Japanese art critics
Japanese educators
Japanese essayists
Japanese photographers
Japanese printmakers
Photography critics
1911 births
1960 deaths
People from Miyazaki Prefecture
20th-century Japanese painters
20th-century printmakers
20th-century essayists